John Benger (died c. 1457), of Pewsey, Wiltshire, was an English politician.

He was a Member (MP) of the Parliament of England for Great Bedwyn in 1420.

References

Year of birth missing
1450s deaths
People from Pewsey
English MPs 1420
Members of the Parliament of England for Great Bedwyn